Jack Shark Lake is a lake located on Vancouver Island on the west side of Augerpoint Mountain west of Mount Albert Edward in Strathcona Provincial Park.

See also
List of lakes of British Columbia

References

Alberni Valley
Lakes of Vancouver Island
Nootka Land District